Haussy is a commune in the Nord department in northern France.

History
During World War I the Germans occupied Haussy. Their brutal treatment of the native French inhabitants is recorded by Private A S Bullock in his memoir, but among his mementoes Bullock also kept a postcard he found on the floor of the village school on 23 October 1918, referring to more peaceful times, including 'Eugenie's first communion'.

Heraldry

Notable people 

 Pierre Mauroy (French: [pjɛʁ moʁwa]; 5 July 1928 – 7 June 2013) was a French Socialist politician who was Prime Minister of France from 1981 to 1984 under President François Mitterrand. Mauroy also served as Mayor of Lille from 1973 to 2001. He arrived in Haussy in 1936. He is eight. His father, Henri, is named director of the School for Boys and the family moves in the housing of the school group Louis-Pasteur dating from 1929.

See also
Communes of the Nord department

References

Communes of Nord (French department)